Ben Anderson is an Australian actor from Melbourne, Australia. He is best known on Australian TV for his role on popular soap Neighbours as lawyer Tim Collins. In 2006–07, he was part of the ensemble cast of the second and third seasons of improvisational game-show Thank God You're Here, played various sketch characters on satirical news show Newstopia, and continued his work on Neighbours.

Filmography

External links

Australian male television actors
Male actors from Melbourne
Living people
Year of birth missing (living people)